Antonios Skordilis (1654 – 1731).  He was a Greek painter.  He was active on the Cycladic Islands.  Other notable Greek painters active on the islands were  Christodoulos Kalergis, Emmanuel Skordilis and Defterevon Sifnios.  Emmanuel Skordilis may have been related to Antonios.  Antonios represents the Greek baroque and Rococo.  The Greek community was undergoing the Modern Greek Enlightenment in art.  He followed the typical Greek mannerisms.  Both Emmanuel and Antonios influenced local artists namely Defterevon Sifnios.  Thirteen of his works survived and two frescos.  His remaining frescos are on the Cycladic island Sikinos.

History
Antonios was born on the island of Crete.  He left the island from a young age to avoid the war. Another famous Greek painter Emmanuel Skordilis shared the same last name.  There is a strong possibility he was his son.  He was also active on the Greek Island Mylos.  Antonios was married.  His wife's name was Touzapias or Zabias.  He had children and came from a wealthy family.  Antonios became a priest.  He traveled all over the Cycladic islands painting.  He was active on several islands.  Some of his surviving frescos are on the island Sikinos.  He lived in Palia Chora on the island Mylos.    
 
On February 20, 1674, he signed a contract with the holy council of the island Mylos.  Another document indicates on November 25, 1731, the priest Antonios bequeathed a piece of land to the Patmos Monastery on the island of Mylos.  According to the document his wife wanted him to donate the land to the Abbot.  The document also gives insight about the painter's children.  He died shortly thereafter.

Notable Works
Evangelismos ΘΚ 1706 Agios Nikolaos tou Plousiou, Chora Kythnos
Archangel Michael, 1706  Agios Nikolaos tou Plousiou, Chora Kythnos

See also
Ioannis Skordilis

References

Bibliography

1654 births
1731 deaths
17th-century Greek people
17th-century Greek painters
People from Crete
18th-century Greek painters
18th-century Greek people
Greek Renaissance humanists